The 2017 Budha Subba Gold Cup is the 19th edition of the Budha Subba Gold Cup held in Dharan and organised by Redbull . 10 teams participated in the tournament. The defending champions Manang Marshyangdi Club did not participate. All matches were held at the ANFA Technical Center Dharan-17. In total, eight teams from Nepal participated in the tournament and were joined by two teams from India. United Sikkim FC from Gangtok, India was also supposed to play in this tournament but had to withdraw due to a "technical problem". It was replaced by Kanchanjunga FC.

Teams

Bracket
The following is the bracket which the 2017 Budha Subba Gold Cup resembled. Numbers in parentheses next to the match score represent the results of a penalty shoot-out.

Awards and prize money
Prize Money for winning team: NPRs 500,000 (Nepal Police Club)
Prize Money for runners-up: NPRs 250,000 (Sankata FC)
Highest Goal Scorer Award: Ju Manu Rai and Anil Gurung (both Sankata FC) They each get NPRs 12,500 as prize money.
Best Coach Award: Kumar Katuwal (Nepal Police Club) Prize money: NPRs 15,000
Best Striker of the Tournament Award: Ju Manu Rai (Nepal Police Club) Prize money: NPRs 15,000
Best Midfielder of the Tournament Award: Heman Gurung (Dharan F.C.) Prize money: NPRs 15,000
Best Defender of the Tournament Award: Bikram Dhimal (Nepal Police Club) Prize money: NPRs 15,000
Best Goalkeeper of the Tournament Award: Roshan Khadka (Nepal Police Club) Prize money: NPRs 15,000
Rising Player of the Tournament Award: Rajin Subba (Dharan F.C.) Prize money: NPRs 10,000

References

Football cup competitions in Nepal
2016–17 in Nepalese football
Budha Subba Gold Cup